Therkukottai is a village in the Orathanadu taluk of Thanjavur district, Tamil Nadu, India.

Demographics 

As per the 2002 census, Therkukottai had a total population of 927 with 435 males and 492 females. The sex ratio was 1131. The literacy rate was 60.54.

References 

 

Villages in Thanjavur district